Dryden Township may refer to one of the following townships in the United States:

 Dryden Township, Michigan
 Dryden Township, Minnesota

Township name disambiguation pages